Dwight Henry (born 1962) is an American actor, baker, and businessman. He is best known for his role as Wink, Hushpuppy's father, in the film Beasts of the Southern Wild (2012). Additionally, Henry is the founder of the Buttermilk Drop Bakery in New Orleans.

Life and career
Born in Nashville, Tennessee, Henry moved to New Orleans, Louisiana, when he was a young child. Having lived there through adulthood, he founded Henry's Bakery and Deli near his home in the historic Tremé neighborhood. The bakery was successful enough that Henry planned to open a second location of his store, until Hurricane Katrina changed his plans.

Though he had no professional training or experience as an actor, the filmmakers of Beasts of the Southern Wild cast him in the film, while allowing him to operate his bakery regularly during shooting. Henry earned positive reviews for the film, which was nominated for the Academy Award for Best Picture, but insists that his primary career is managing his bakery, now called the Buttermilk Drop Bakery. He agreed to open a second location of his store in Harlem in the near future.

He continued his acting career and appeared in Steve McQueen's 12 Years a Slave (2013). He will portray Marvin Gay, Sr., the father and killer of the late soul music icon Marvin Gaye in the biopic Sexual Healing.

Filmography

References

External links
 
 Buttermilk Drop Bakery Official Site

Living people
21st-century American male actors
Male actors from New Orleans
American male film actors
American bakers
21st-century American businesspeople
African-American male actors
Male actors from Tennessee
Male actors from Nashville, Tennessee
1962 births
21st-century African-American people
20th-century African-American people